Tomáš Pospíšil (born 25 August 1987) is a Czech professional ice hockey forward currently playing for HC Verva Litvínov of the Czech Extraliga.

Playing career
He previously played senior hockey for HC Oceláři Třinec (2004–2005) before moving to Canada with junior team Sarnia Sting in the Ontario Hockey League (2005–2007). He was drafted 135th over by Atlanta in the 2005 NHL Entry Draft. He has yet to play in the National Hockey League, splitting 2007–2008 with the Chicago Wolves of the American Hockey League and the Gwinnett Gladiators of the ECHL.

Career statistics

Regular season and playoffs

International

References

1987 births
Living people
Czech ice hockey left wingers
Atlanta Thrashers draft picks
Albany River Rats players
HC Benátky nad Jizerou players
HC Bílí Tygři Liberec players
Chicago Wolves players
Gwinnett Gladiators players
HC Kometa Brno players
BK Mladá Boleslav players
HC Oceláři Třinec players
HC Slavia Praha players
Hokej Šumperk 2003 players
Piráti Chomutov players
Sarnia Sting players
Stadion Hradec Králové players
HC Shakhtyor Soligorsk players
MsHK Žilina players
HC Nové Zámky players
HC Litvínov players
People from Šumperk
Sportspeople from the Olomouc Region
Czech expatriate ice hockey players in the United States
Czech expatriate ice hockey players in Canada
Czech expatriate ice hockey players in Slovakia
Czech expatriate sportspeople in Belarus
Expatriate ice hockey players in Belarus